Banks-Mack House is a historic home located at Fort Mill, York County, South Carolina. It was built about 1871, and enlarged and renovated in the Classical Revival style in 1910.  It is a two-story, frame dwelling with a one-story, hip roofed wraparound porch.  The porch once encompassed a large hickory tree that was removed because of damage from Hurricane Hugo in September 1989.

It was added to the National Register of Historic Places in 1992.

References

Houses on the National Register of Historic Places in South Carolina
Neoclassical architecture in South Carolina
Houses completed in 1910
Houses in York County, South Carolina
National Register of Historic Places in York County, South Carolina